Empress Xiaojing may refer to:

Empress Wang Zhi (孝景皇后) (173BC – 126BC), wife of Emperor Jing of Han
Empress Dowager Xiaojing (孝靖太后) (1565–1611), biological mother of the Ming dynasty Taichang Emperor
Empress Xiaojingxian (孝敬憲皇后) (1679–1731), wife of the Qing dynasty Yongzheng Emperor
Empress Xiaojingcheng (孝静成皇后) (1812–1855), imperial noble consort of the Qing dynasty Daoguang Emperor